Henthorn is a surname. Notable people with the surname include:

James Henthorn (1744–1832), Irish surgeon
Karen Henthorn (born 1963), English actress

Fictional
Sean Henthorn, a character in Jericho

See also
Henthorn v Fraser